Rough Riders' Round-up is a 1939 American Western film directed by Joseph Kane and starring Roy Rogers. Set at the end of the Spanish–American War, Roy and several of his comrades in arms from the Rough Riders become US Border Patrolmen on the Mexican border.

Cast 
Roy Rogers as Roy Rogers
Lynne Roberts as Dorothy Blair
Raymond Hatton as Rusty Coburn
Eddie Acuff as Tommy Ward
William Pawley as Arizona Jack Moray
Dorothy Sebastian as Rose
George Meeker as George Lanning
Guy Usher as Mr. Blair
Duncan Renaldo as Border Commandante

Soundtrack 
 Roy Rogers - "Ridin' Down the Trail" (Written by Eddie Cherkose, Cy Feuer and Roy Rogers)
 Roy Rogers - "Here on the Range With You" (Written by Tim Spencer)
 Soldiers during the opening credits - "When Johnny Comes Marching Home" (Written by Louis Lambert, a pseudonym for Patrick Sarsfield Gilmore)

External links 

1939 films
1939 Western (genre) films
Republic Pictures films
American black-and-white films
American Western (genre) films
Films scored by William Lava
Films directed by Joseph Kane
1930s English-language films
1930s American films